Shexingshan is a rural town in Louxing District of Loudi, Hunan, China. The town has 37 villages and a community under its jurisdiction.

History
Two villages of Zimu and Gutang were transferred from Hongshandian Town to Shexingshan in January 2017. The town of Shexingshan was transferred from Shuangfeng County to Louxing on January 24, 2017.

Administrative division
The town is divided into 57 villages and 2 communities which consist of: Gaowu Community, Lixin  Community, Fengshutai Village, Hongfu Village, Caolai Village, Qingling Village, Shexing Village, Fengxing Village, Shiwan Village, Hongqiao Village, Chongkou Village, Tanwan Village, Wanfu Village, Nantang Village, Quankou Village, Qiuhu Village, Dangjia Village, Dingzhu Village, Nidang Village, Qinlun Village, Nichong Village, Shuangquan Village, Quanshan Village, Yueshan Village, Quanchong Village, Xinyang Village, Shanhe Village, Kangnan Village, Jinbu Village, Yaoqiao Village, Hengzhong Village, Gaotang Village, Xinlian Village, Xinhong Village, Nankou Village, Huangjing Village, Huaqiao Village, Tianjing Village, Chidian Village, Risheng Village, Nongsheng Village, Shanmu Village, Shangshanmu Village, Jinxi Village, Dalu Village, Mayang Village, Yanjia Village, Longtanjiang Village, Guangyao Village, Xinzeng Village, Wanqian Village, Qianjia Village, Baizhu Village, Batang Village, Anshan Village, Quantang Village, Fuzhou Village, Shirui Village, and Xinlai Village.

Geography
The town shares a border with Hongshandian Town to the west, Xingzipu Town to the east, Wanbao Town to the northwest, Maotian Town to the northeast, and Zoumajie Town to the south.

Transportation

Expressway
G60 Shanghai–Kunming Expressway passes across the town north to south.

Railway
Loudi–Shaoyang railway runs north-south through the west of the town.

References

Divisions of Shuangfeng County